This is a list of the top-selling singles in New Zealand for 2011 from the Official New Zealand Music Chart's end-of-year chart, compiled by Recorded Music NZ.

Chart 
Key
 – Song of New Zealand origin

Top 20 singles of 2011 by New Zealand artists

Notes

References 

 Top Selling NZ Singles of 2011 - Recorded Music NZ

External links 
 The Official NZ Music Chart - singles

2011 in New Zealand music
2011 record charts
Singles 2011